The 1992 United States Senate election in Georgia was held on November 3, 1992. Incumbent Democratic U.S. Senator Wyche Fowler did not receive a simple majority in the general election, which demanded a runoff. Coverdell edged out Fowler in the runoff with a narrow margin, concurrent with Democrat Bill Clinton's win in the state in the presidential election. It was the first Senate runoff election to be held in Georgia since runoffs were first mandated in 1964.

Republican primary
The general primary was held July 21, 1992.  A run-off between the top two Republican contenders was held on August 11, in which Paul Coverdell defeated Bob Barr.

Candidates
 Bob Barr, President of Southeastern Legal Foundation and former U.S. Attorney for the Northern District of Georgia
 Paul Coverdell, former Director of the Peace Corps and State Senator from Atlanta
 John Knox, former Mayor of Waycross
 Dean Parkison, retired drug store owner and perennial candidate
 Charlie Tanskley

Results
Results for the first round showed that since Paul Coverdell did not win a majority of the vote, a runoff was held between him and Barr. Coverdell subsequently won the runoff.

General election

Candidates 
 Paul Coverdell, former State Senator from Atlanta (Republican)
 Wyche Fowler, incumbent U.S. Senator (Democratic)
 Jim Hudson (Libertarian)

Results

Initial 
As no candidate reached a majority on November 3, a runoff election was held on November 24, which Coverdell won.

Run off

Aftermath
The Georgia Legislature, then controlled by Democrats, changed the state's laws requiring a run-off election only if the winning candidate received less than 45% of the vote. In the 1996 Senate election, the winner, Democrat Max Cleland won with only 48.9% (1.4% ahead of Republican Guy Millner) thus avoiding a run-off. In 2005 after Republicans took control of the legislature, the run-off requirement was changed back to 50%.

The result of this election would later repeat in reverse in the 2020-21 regular Senate election in Georgia, with Republican David Perdue winning the first round but falling less than one percent below the 50% threshold required to avoid a runoff, and then being defeated in the runoff by Democrat Jon Ossoff with a similar one point margin.

See also
 1992 United States Senate elections

References

1992 Georgia (U.S. state) elections
Georgia
1992